The 2006–07 Luxembourg Cup was the 11th playing of the Luxembourg Cup ice hockey tournament. Four teams participated in the tournament, which was won by Tornado Luxembourg.

Final standings

External links 
 Season on icehockey.lu

Luxembourg Cup
Luxembourg Cup (ice hockey) seasons